Tapa Army Base, which lies to the south of the town Tapa, is the largest military base in Estonia. The base is next to the Central Training Area, excellent for artillery live-fire exercises and tracked unit maneuvers.

History
Tapa Army Base is one of the few former Soviet military facilities that was taken over by the Estonian Defence Forces in the early 1990s. The oldest facility is the airfield, which was built in the autumn of 1939 by the Red Army. The Soviet Air Defence Forces later stationed the 656th Fighter Regiment equipped with 40 MiG-23MLD fighters at Tapa Airfield. In the 1960s the base received a tank and a pioneer training regiment. During the Soviet exploitation of the base, a lot of ecological damage was done, mainly due to the poor handling of oil and other fuels.

Present day

There are eight barracks in the compound and two more are being constructed. Three of the new barracks are for the NATO Enhanced Forward Presence multinational battle group in Estonia. The base canteen can serve up to 3200 personnel. There are repair shops, garages, study halls, and shelters in the base.

In the future tracked armored maneuver units will be relocated to the Tapa military base. Maintenance facilities and shelters will be built for armored and unarmored vehicles.

Military units
The Tapa Army Base accommodates the following units:
  Headquarters of the 1st Infantry Brigade together with HQ and Signals company and Reconnaissance company 
  Scouts Battalion
  Engineer Battalion including Engineer School 
  Artillery Battalion including Artillery School
  Air Defence Battalion including Air Defense School
  Combat Service Support Battalion
 NATO Enhanced Forward Presence (eFP) Battalion

See also
 Taara Army Base
 Ämari Air Base
 Tapa town
 Tapa Airfield

References

External links

Tapa, Estonia
Military installations of Estonia
Buildings and structures in Lääne-Viru County